The Drunkard (French: La pocharde) is a 1937 French drama film directed by Jean-Louis Bouquet and Jean Kemm and starring Germaine Rouer, Jean Debucourt and Jacqueline Daix. The film's sets were designed by the art director Claude Bouxin. It is based on the 1898 novel of the same title by Jules Mary which was remade in 1953.

Cast
 Germaine Rouer as Charlotte Lamarche  
 Jean Debucourt as Le docteur Marignan  
 Jacqueline Daix as Claire Lamarche  
 Jacqueline Dumonceau as Louise Lamarche  
 Bernard Lancret as Gauthier Marignan  
 Henri Bosc as Berthelin  
 Robert Pizani as Moëb  
 Fred Poulin as L'avocat général  
 Marcelle Samson as Mademoiselle Poupette 
 Tarquini d'Or 
 Marie-Louise Derval 
 Paul Escoffier 
 Ginette Leclerc 
 Jean Liézer 
 Michèle Ott 
 Georges Paulais 
 Lina Roxa

References

Bibliography
 Goble, Alan. The Complete Index to Literary Sources in Film. Walter de Gruyter, 1999.

External links

1937 films
1937 drama films
French drama films
1930s French-language films
Films directed by Jean-Louis Bouquet
Films directed by Jean Kemm
Films scored by Maurice Yvain
French black-and-white films
1930s French films